SXT may refer to:

 Soft X-ray transient or X-ray nova
 soft X-ray telescope, a telescope that views soft X-rays
 an instrument on the Yohkoh (SOLAR-A) space probe
 an instrument on the Astrosat space probe
 an instrument on the Hitomi (ASTRO-H) space probe
 Saxitoxin
 Co-trimoxazole
 SXT Technology Solutions, a European telecommunications company
 the ICAO airline code for Servicios De Taxi Aéreo, see Airline codes-S
 the rail code for Salem Town railway station
 the NYSE stock ticker symbol for Sensient Technologies Corporation
 the sign extend operation for the PDP-11 architecture
 SXT the former trim model for a Dodge Grand Caravan.